Kathryn Janeway is a fictional character in the Star Trek franchise. She was the Captain of the Starfleet starship USS Voyager (on Star Trek: Voyager) while it was lost in the Delta Quadrant on the other side of the galaxy. After returning home to the Alpha Quadrant, she is promoted to Vice-Admiral and briefly appears in the 2002 film Star Trek: Nemesis. She is seen again commanding the USS Dauntless in Star Trek: Prodigy, searching for the missing USS Protostar which was being commanded by Captain Chakotay, her former first officer on Voyager, at the time of its disappearance.

Although other female captains had appeared in previous Star Trek episodes and other media, Janeway was the only one to serve as the central character of a live-action Star Trek TV series. She has also appeared in other media including books and video games. In all of her screen appearances, she was played by Kate Mulgrew.

Casting

Star Trek: Voyager
During development, one of the actors considered for Captain before it was decided it would be a woman, was Gary Graham. Some of the actresses who had been considered in the first time around besides Bujold and Mulgrew, included Erin Gray, Patty Duke, and Susan Gibney.

The character was originally named Elizabeth Janeway, after the noted writer of the same name. However, after Geneviève Bujold was cast, she requested the character to be renamed "Nicole Janeway".  Bujold was initially very positive, saying in an interview, "This role is a challenge but it feels right." Bujold, whose experience was mainly in feature films, was unprepared for the schedule demanded by the television series, was unwilling to do news interviews, and dropped out on the second day of filming for the pilot episode "Caretaker". Kate Mulgrew, who had previously auditioned for the role, was brought in. She suggested that the name be changed to "Kathryn", to which the producers agreed. Actresses Erin Gray and Chelsea Field (wife of future Star Trek captain Scott Bakula) also auditioned for the role.

When Bujold left on September 8, 1994, some of the other actresses who had been (re)considered were Joanna Cassidy, Susan Gibney, Elizabeth Dennehy, Tracy Scoggins,  and Lindsay Crouse according to Entertainment Weekly. The pressure to find a new person for the role was extraordinary. Not only was shooting already behind schedule, but the launch feature also had to be ready by January 1995. It was not only the launch of series, but would also be the flagship for newly launching United Paramount Network (UPN), and over 20 million dollars was being spent on the pilot.

Star Trek: Nemesis
Mulgrew reprises the character Janeway in a cameo in the 2002 feature film Nemesis.

Star Trek: Prodigy
In October 2020, Mulgrew confirmed she would voice Janeway in Star Trek: Prodigy. The show begin to air in 2021, and is about teenagers having adventures on a starship. Executive Producer Alex Kurtzman said of the choice, "We can think of no better captain to inspire the next generation of dreamers on Nickelodeon, than she." The show is computer animated and premiered on Nickelodeon in October 2021. In April, 2021, it was revealed that this character would be an emergency training hologram based on Janeway.

The real Admiral Janeway entered the story in the episode "A Moral Star, Part 2". Janeway is searching for her former first officer, now Captain, Chakotay of the USS Protostar. She commands the USS Dauntless which features a quantum slip-stream drive. The ship is based on schematics the crew of the USS Voyager obtained under Janeway's command in the delta quadrant of another USS Dauntless, a ship used to bait the crew into getting assimilated by the Borg (Hope and Fear). Janeway's USS Dauntless is a Dauntless-Class starship with a quantum-slipstream drive, which she uses to try to keep up with the Protostar and its protowarp capability.

The events of "Supernova, Part 2" caused Mulgrew's primary role in the series to shift to Admiral Janeway. Within this episode, the holographic Janeway stays on the Protostar in order to enact the self-destruct to destroy a "living construct" installed on the Protostar threatening to obliterate Starfleet. Though she promises to copy herself so she can join her young protégés, she is unable to do so due to the vastly increased complexity of her program, meaning her program is lost when the Protostar is destroyed, something she makes sure the kids only discover when it is too late. When the kids reach Starfleet Headquarters, Admiral Janeway vouches for them and takes them under her wing as warrant officers.

Character biography

In the Star Trek universe, Kathryn Janeway was born on May 20, 2336 in Bloomington, Indiana on Earth. She was the daughter of Vice Admiral Janeway and has a sister named Phoebe, who is the artist in the family. Phoebe never chose to join Starfleet and stayed close to home with her mother, Gretchen Janeway.  Kathryn Janeway was very close to her father, who taught her to look at the universe with a scientist's eye; she was devastated by his death. Her first mission after graduating the academy was as a science officer on the USS Al-Batani, where she served as Chief Science Officer during the Arias mission.

Captain Janeway takes command of the Intrepid-class USS Voyager in 2371. Their first mission is to locate and capture a Maquis vessel last seen in the area of space known as the Badlands. While there, the Maquis ship and Voyager are transported against their will into the Delta Quadrant, 70,000 light-years away, by a massive displacement wave.  The Maquis ship is destroyed while fighting the Kazon-Ogla, and although Voyager survives, there are numerous casualties. In order to protect the Ocampa, who live on a planet Voyager visits, Janeway destroys the Caretaker Array, the space station that transported the two ships to the Delta Quadrant, which provides energy to the Ocampa's planet, despite the fact that the Array may be the two ships' only chance to return home. In doing this, Janeway strands her ship and crew seven decades' travel from home.

Her first major task is integrating the surviving Maquis and Voyager crews. Chakotay, captain of the Maquis ship, succeeds the deceased Lieutenant Commander Cavit as her first officer. Janeway also grants convicted criminal, former Starfleet officer, and accomplished pilot Tom Paris a field commission, and makes him Voyagers helmsman.

Janeway's other interactions with her crew include helping the de-assimilated Borg Seven of Nine reclaim her individuality and humanity and advocating for the Doctor's status as a sentient being.

During the course of the TV series, Voyager has contact with the Q Continuum on three occasions, and repeated contact with the Borg. With the intervention of a future/alternate version of herself, Janeway leads her crew in using one of the Borg's transwarp conduits to return her ship to Federation space after having traveled through the Delta Quadrant for seven years.

In a cameo in the film Star Trek: Nemesis, now-Admiral Janeway instructs Captain Jean-Luc Picard to travel to Romulus at the invitation of the film's antagonist.

A few years after Voyager's return to Federation space and Janeway's subsequent promotion to Admiral, Janeway commands the USS Dauntless in an effort to locate her former first officer Chakotay who disappeared while commanding the USS Protostar.

Non-canon 
Admiral Janeway also appeared in the Borg Invasion 4-D ride at the Star Trek: The Experience venue in Las Vegas, which closed in 2008. In the ride, Janeway leads Voyager to the rescue of ride participants who are ostensibly trapped first on a space station and later on a shuttlecraft that come under attack by a Borg Cube commanded by the Borg Queen. At the ride's end, Janeway tells the participants, "Congratulations. You've defeated the Borg with one thing the Queen can never assimilate: the human spirit. As long as we have that, resistance will never be futile."

Janeway continued as a major character in the Star Trek novels that depict the events in the lives of the Voyager characters after the end of that series. In Peter David's 2007 Star Trek: The Next Generation novel, Before Dishonor, which is set after the events of Star Trek: Nemesis, Janeway is assimilated by a rogue faction of the Borg, and becomes their new Borg Queen. Seven of Nine, with the aid of Ambassador Spock and the Enterprise-E crew, manages to communicate with Janeway's consciousness, buried deep within the Queen's mind. During a brief moment of contact, Janeway helps them destroy the Borg cube, with all hands on board. Although Seven manages to escape, Janeway is killed. Her memorial service sees a vast turnout, and a tall gleaming pillar with a light burning atop it is constructed in tribute to her.  The Q female appears to Janeway's spirit, and tells her that Q and the Q Continuum had taken an interest in her. Telling her that she has a destiny, Lady Q takes Janeway by the hand, and disappears with her into realms unknown. Writer Peter David explained the book was conceived by Pocket Books editorial as one in which Janeway would die, and that he was brought in to write it in order to give her a reportedly heroic send-off.

In the 2012 Star Trek: Voyager novel The Eternal Tide by Kirsten Beyer, Janeway returns to human life with the help of young Q, who needs her assistance, and by the book's end resumes her admiralship in Starfleet. In the 2014 Star Trek: Voyager novel Protectors by Kirsten Beyer, Janeway goes back to Earth per orders of Starfleet Command; by the end of the book she returns to the Delta Quadrant, taking charge of the starships stationed there. She continues this mission in Beyer's second 2014 Star Trek: Voyager novel, Acts of Contrition.

In Cryptic Studios' online role-playing game, Star Trek Online, Janeway was physically added to game in January 2022 along with voiceover work by Kate Mulgrew as part of the game's twelfth anniversary. Prior to her addition, Janeway was only occasionally mentioned in the game. She was also retroactively added to the game's 2014 Delta Rising expansion.

Reception
In 2019, Vulture.com ranked Captain Kathryn Janeway as the number one Star Trek captain by their selection criterion, a combination of competency and managerial style. In particular, they note her ability to overcome great challenges despite being on the other side of the Galaxy and commanding a crew in large part consisting of non-Starfleet personnel. One of her interesting relationships is noted as with the former Maquis B'Elanna Torres (played by Roxann Dawson), and the former Borg Seven of Nine (played by Jeri Ryan). Space.com rated Janeway as the number three best captain of Star Trek. In 2017, The Washington Post ranked Janeway as the third best Captain of Star Trek.

Screen Rant rated her the fifth best captain of the franchise, noting her ability to command in adverse situations; two praises were that she does not give up easily and tries to maintain crew morale. In a review of female characters from science fiction television and film, Janeway was in the top ten. Captain Janeway was ranked as the 18th best character of all Star Trek by IGN in 2009. In 2016, Captain Janeway was ranked as the 8th most important character of Starfleet within the Star Trek science fiction universe by Wired magazine.

The romance between Janeway and Kashyk in "Counterpoint" was praised by Screen Rant, which they rated as one of the ten best episodes of Star Trek: Voyager. In 2018, CBR ranked Janeway as the 4th best Starfleet character of Star Trek. In 2017, Screen Rant ranked Kathryn Janeway as the 18th most attractive person in the Star Trek universe.

In 2018, The Gamer ranked Janeway as one of the top fifteen starship captains of the Star Trek franchise.

Captain Janeway was rated as one of the top seven time travelers, in the whole Star Trek franchise by Nerdist in 2019, for her exploits in "Endgame".

In July 2019, Screen Rant ranked Janeway the 4th smartest character of Star Trek.

Legacy

There's coffee in that nebula 
In 2015, astronaut Samantha Cristoforetti tweeted "There's coffee in that nebula", quoting Janeway from the Star Trek: Voyager episode "The Cloud". She accompanied this tweet with a photo of her wearing a Star Trek uniform aboard the International Space Station. The space station was getting a shipment of supplies which triggered a chance to say how coffee really was in the incoming spacecraft (a Dragon cargo spacecraft). The spacecraft was carrying the ISSpresso machine which really would allow coffee beverages to be made aboard the space station.

Birthplace monument 
In 2019, a group of Bloomington, Indiana residents formed what is now The Janeway Collective with the goal of building a birthplace monument such as the one existing for James T. Kirk in Riverside, Iowa. Through attending local events and raising awareness, and with the permission of CBS, they were able to successfully raise funds through a crowdsourcing campaign on the platform Patronicity and received a matching grant from the Indiana Housing and Community Development Authority's CreatINg Place program.

An official groundbreaking event took place on June 27, 2020, and the monument was unveiled on October 24, 2020, after being delayed from the planned date of May 20, 2020 due to the COVID-19 pandemic. Kate Mulgrew attended the unveiling virtually due to the pandemic. The monument is constructed of a cast bronze bust with a limestone base with stainless steel plate, and was sculpted by Aaron Eby. It is located on the B-Line Trail immediately next to the WonderLab science museum.

On October 23, 2022, almost two years after the unveiling, Kate Mulgrew visited the monument in person, fulfilling the promise she made when the statue was unveiled.

See also

 List of female action heroes

References

External links

Television characters introduced in 1995
Fictional characters from Indiana
Fictional female captains
Fictional female admirals
Star Trek (film franchise) characters
Star Trek: Voyager characters
Starfleet officers
Starfleet captains
Starfleet admirals
Female characters in television
Fictional people from the 24th-century